Godfrey is an extinct town in Stevens County, in the U.S. state of Washington.

A post office called Godfrey was established in 1905, and remained in operation until 1912. The community was named after the Godfrey brothers, the proprietors of a local sawmill.

References

Ghost towns in Washington (state)
Ghost towns in Stevens County, Washington